Conus lizardensis, common name the Siboga cone, is a species of sea snail, a marine gastropod mollusk in the family Conidae, the cone snails and their allies.

Like all species within the genus Conus, these snails are predatory and venomous. They are capable of "stinging" humans, therefore live ones should be handled carefully or not at all.

This species was named after Lizard Island, NE Australia.

Description
Conus lizardensis is part of a species complex including C. albellus, C. limpusi and C. colmani, that needs re-evaluation. For conservation implications, all are here tentatively listed as distinct. The size of the shell varies between 25 mm and 55 mm. It shows a twofold character of the spiral ridges and strong raised lines of increment. The top of the volutions have a fine sculpture.

Distribution
This marine species occurs off Indonesia, New Guinea and Australia (Northern Territory, Queensland, Western Australia).

References

 Crosse, H. 1865. Description de cones nouveaux provenant de la collection Cuming Journal de Conchyliologie 13: 299–315 
 Schepman, M.M. 1913. Toxoglossa. 384–396 in Weber, M. & de Beaufort, L.F. (eds). The Prosobranchia, Pulmonata and Opisthobranchia Tectibranchiata, Tribe Bullomorpha, of the Siboga Expedition. Monograph 49. Siboga Expeditie 32(2)
 Wilson, B. 1994. Australian Marine Shells. Prosobranch Gastropods. Kallaroo, WA : Odyssey Publishing Vol. 2 370 pp.
 Röckel, D., Korn, W. & Kohn, A.J. 1995. Manual of the Living Conidae. Volume 1: Indo-Pacific Region. Wiesbaden : Hemmen 517 pp.
 Tucker J.K. & Tenorio M.J. (2009) Systematic classification of Recent and fossil conoidean gastropods. Hackenheim: Conchbooks. 296 pp.
 Puillandre N., Duda T.F., Meyer C., Olivera B.M. & Bouchet P. (2015). One, four or 100 genera? A new classification of the cone snails. Journal of Molluscan Studies. 81: 1–23

External links
 The Conus Biodiversity website
 Cone Shells – Knights of the Sea
 

lizardensis
Gastropods described in 1865